Đorđe Pantić (Serbian Cyrillic: Ђорђе Пантић; born 27 January 1980) is a Serbian former professional footballer who played as a goalkeeper.

Career
After beginning his career at Radnički Beograd, Pantić was transferred to Partizan on 1 July 1999. He made four appearances in the 2003–04 UEFA Champions League, debuting for Partizan with a clean sheet in a goalless home draw versus Real Madrid on 4 November 2003.

In August 2011, Pantić signed a one-plus-one-year contract with Sarajevo. He made his debut for the club in a 5–4 cup loss away at Rudar Prijedor on 19 October 2011, as Sarajevo advanced to the next round. In May 2012, Pantić left the club.

In 2014, Pantić began working as a goalkeeper coach at Partizan.

Personal life
In 2007, he married Serbian karateka Snežana Pantić (née Perić) with whom he has a daughter named Manja (born 2007).

Honours
Partizan
 First League of FR Yugoslavia: 2001–02, 2002–03, 2004–05
 FR Yugoslavia Cup: 2000–01

Debrecen
 Nemzeti Bajnokság I: 2008–09, 2009–10
 Magyar Kupa: 2009–10
 Ligakupa: 2009–10
 Szuperkupa: 2009, 2010

References

External links

 
 HLSZ profile
 
 

1980 births
Living people
Footballers from Belgrade
Armenian Premier League players
Association football goalkeepers
Association football goalkeeping coaches
Debreceni VSC players
Enköpings SK players
Expatriate footballers in Armenia
Expatriate footballers in Bosnia and Herzegovina
Expatriate footballers in Germany
Expatriate footballers in Hungary
Expatriate footballers in Sweden
FC Pyunik players
First League of Serbia and Montenegro players
FK Obilić players
FK Partizan players
FK Radnički Beograd players
FK Sarajevo players
FK Teleoptik players
Nemzeti Bajnokság I players
Serbian expatriate footballers
Serbian expatriate sportspeople in Armenia
Serbian expatriate sportspeople in Bosnia and Herzegovina
Serbian expatriate sportspeople in Germany
Serbian expatriate sportspeople in Hungary
Serbian expatriate sportspeople in Sweden
Serbian footballers
Serbian SuperLiga players
Superettan players
TuS Koblenz players
FK Partizan non-playing staff